Adelina Adato Barrion (September 9, 1951 – July 10, 2010) was a Filipino entomologist and geneticist whose extensive contribution to the study of Philippine spiders earned her the moniker "Asia's Spider Woman," although she also contributed significantly to the study of other species, and to the study of genetics in general.

She also headed the Genetics and Molecular Biology Division of the Institute of Biological Sciences, at the University of the Philippines Los Baños' College of Arts and Sciences, and served as the curator of the UPLB Museum of Natural History.

Education
Barrion graduated from her bachelor's degree in Entomology at the UPLB College of Agriculture in 1974, and earned her Master's and Doctorate degrees in Genetics (Entomology) in 1978 and 1985, respectively.

Awards
Honors awarded to Barrion over the years include:
 Uichanco Award for Outstanding Entomologist (Philippine Association of Entomologists) - May 23, 1997
 NAST Outstanding Research Paper (Department of Science and Technology - National Academy of Science and Technology, DOST-NAST) - July 17, 1996
 Outstanding Teacher in Biological Sciences (University of the Philippines) - March 3, 1994
 CAS Outstanding Alumnus (UPLB Alumni Association) - 1992
 Outstanding Model Lady Educator and Public Servant of the Year (Media Exponent of the Philippine Unity and Progress, Inc.) -  November 15, 1992
 SEARCA Professional Chair Holder in Genetics (Southeast Asian Ministers of Education Organization-Southeast Asian Regional Center for Graduate Study and Research in Agriculture)- January 1990 – December 1991
 Outstanding Young Scientist Award (NAST-DOST) -July 11, 1990
 Outstanding Biologist (Philobioscientia) - February 22, 1990
 Best Paper Award in Entomology (Pest Control Council of the Philippines) - May 12, 1989
 Outstanding Researcher (UPLB College of Arts and Sciences) - November 23, 1988
 Outstanding Researcher (UPLB Institute of Biological Sciences) - November 13, 1988
 Golden Leadership Award (Humanitarian Center of the Philippines) - December 13, 1987
 Luisito Cuy Memorial Award (Luisito S. Cuy Foundation) - 1987
 Kalayaan Award (International Public Assistance Civic Organization) - 1987
 Best Paper Award, Entomology (Pest Control Council of the Philippines) - 1985
 IRRI Fellowship (International Rice Research Institute) - 1981–1985
 IPB Fellowship (UPLB College of Agriculture) - 1969–1978
 UP Undergraduate Fellowship (University of the Philippines Los Banos) - 1969–1974

References

Arachnologists
Filipino biologists
Filipino women academics
University of the Philippines Los Baños alumni
2010 deaths
1951 births
Filipino women scientists
Filipino geneticists
Women entomologists
Women geneticists
Academic staff of the University of the Philippines
20th-century women scientists